Adam B. Ellick is a  correspondent for The New York Times.

In the summer of 2009, Ellick filmed a documentary about Malala Yousafzai. In 2011, he was part of the team with New York Times that won a Pulitzer Prize for the "best use of video category" for his coverage inside the everyday lives of Pakistanis

References

American newspaper reporters and correspondents
Living people
The New York Times writers
Year of birth missing (living people)
Place of birth missing (living people)
Ithaca College alumni